Joglo is a type of traditional vernacular house of the Javanese people (Javanese omah). The word joglo refers to the shape of the roof. In the highly hierarchical Javanese culture, the type of the roof of a house reflects the social and economic status of the owners of the house; joglo houses are traditionally associated with Javanese aristocrats.

Joglo rooves can be implemented on a dwelling (omah) or a pavilion (pendopo).

Structure and architecture 

The joglo roof is the most complex of all Javanese roof types. Different with the other type of Javanese roof such as the limasan and kampung roof, joglo roof does not use king posts. Joglo roof consists of columns that become higher as it go to the center. The four innermost main house columns are often the tallest, while the outer columns are the lowest. These four innermost house columns support a roof that is the steepest of all type of Javanese roof; almost forming a pyramid, except that it comes to two points rather than a single one. These four innermost main house columns is surmounted by a unique structural element known as tumpang sari. A tumpang sari is basically layered beams structure; the outermost band of beams support the rafters of both the upper and lower roofs, while the heavily-ornate inner band of beams create a vaulted ceiling in the form of an inverted stepped pyramid.

The basic joglo-type houses can be increased in size by adding extra columns and extending the roof area outwards. Some very large joglo roof, such as the roof of the Grand Pendopo of the Mangkunegaran Palace, has a shape reminiscent of a mountain.

Traditionally, joglo roof is used for the house proper (omah) or the pavilion (pendopo) of noble families. In a large house compound of a Javanese noble family, joglo roof covers the very center part of the house. The space in the middle of the house, known as the dalem, is considered the most sacred. This sacred space – especially the area beneath the tumpang sari – is often left empty. In modern time, the area has no specific usage, but traditionally an incense was burnt once a week in this area to honor the rice goddess Dewi Sri, or in Central Java, to honor Nyai Roro Kidul. This sacred area is also the area where the bride and bridegroom are seated during their marriage ceremony.

The joglo roof is an iconic Javanese roof form. Joglo roof has influenced the development of Dutch colonial architecture in Indonesia. Modern buildings in Indonesia, such as big hall or airport terminal buildings, sometimes use the joglo roof.

Social status 
  
In a structured Javanese society and tradition, the joglo house is traditionally associated with the residence of Javanese aristocrats. The joglo-type houses is reserved for Javanese palace, official residence, government estate, and the house of nobles (ningrat).

Types of Joglo 
There are seven types of joglo building: Joglo Kepuhan (used for the peringgitan), Taraju Mas, Lambang Gantung or Pangrawit (used for the audience hall of royal palace), Joglo Wantah, Joglo Ceblokan, Tawon Boni and Semar Tinandu. Joglo buildings are further divided into two styles, the male and female; the difference between them is that the male version is larger in dimension than the female.

See also 

 Javanese traditional house
 Pendopo
 Indonesian architecture
 Kraton (Indonesia)

References

Works cited

Rumah adat
Javanese culture
House types